Valencia Joyner Koomson is an associate professor in the Department of Electrical and Computer Engineering at the Tufts University School of Engineering. Koomson is also the principal investigator for the Advanced Integrated Circuits and Systems Lab at Tufts University.

Background 

Koomson was born in Washington, DC, and graduated from Benjamin Banneker Academic High School. Her parents, Otis and Vernese Joyner, moved to Washington DC during the Great Migration after living for years as sharecroppers in Wilson County, North Carolina. Her oldest known relative is Hagar Atkinson, an enslaved African woman whose name is recorded in the will of a plantation owner in Johnston County, North Carolina.

Career 

Koomson attended the Massachusetts Institute of Technology, graduating with a BS in Electrical Engineering and Computer Science in 1998 and a Masters of Engineering in 1999. Koomson went on to receive her PhD in Electrical Engineering from the University of Cambridge in 2003.

Koomson was an adjunct professor at Howard University from 2004 to 2005, and during that period was a Senior Research Engineer at the University of Southern California's Information Sciences Institute (USC/ISI). She was a Visiting Professor at Rensselaer Polytechnic Institute and Boston University in 2008 and 2013, respectively. Koomson joined Tufts University in 2005 as an assistant professor, and became an associate professor in 2011. In 2020, Koomson was named an MLK Visiting Professor at MIT for the academic year 2020/2021.

Research 

Koomson's research lies at the intersection of biology, medicine, and electrical engineering. Her interests are in nanoelectronic circuits and systems for wearable and implantable medical devices and advanced nano-/microfluidic systems to probe intercellular communication. Koomson has co-authored several book chapters and other publications, and holds a patent for a system and method for measuring phase delay and amplitude of an optical signal in animal tissue. During her time as a researcher at USC, she performed research on the design of radiation-hardened analog/mixed signal VLSI systems in CMOS for military and space applications.
Her Advanced Integrated Circuits and Systems Lab continues to do research into the design and implementation of innovative high-performance, low-power microsystems, with a focus on the integration of heterogeneous devices/materials (optical, RF, bio/chemical) with silicon circuit architectures to address challenges in high-speed wireless communication, biomedical imaging, and sensing.

Honors and awards 
 Eta Kappa Nu Honor Society, 1998
 Marshall Scholarship, 1999–2001
 National Science Foundation CAREER Award, 2010
 Technical Program Chair of the 60th IEEE Midwest Symposium on Circuits in Systems, 2017
 Member of the Midwest Symposium on Circuits and Systems Steering Committee, 2013–
MLK Visiting Professor at MIT, 2020

References

External links 

African-American women engineers
American women engineers
African-American engineers
Tufts University faculty
Living people
Year of birth missing (living people)
21st-century African-American people
21st-century African-American women